The National Capital Regional Command, known officially as the NCRCom or NCRC, is one of the Armed Forces of the Philippines' former Wide Support Commands Combating Terrorism-Insurgency and act as support units to the Philippine National Police-National Capital Region in maintaining peace and order within Metro Manila. They also support SoLCom in anti-dissidence operations in Cavite and Laguna.

Line Units

Base Units
 Headquarters & Headquarters Service Support Company
 7th Civil Relations Group, AFP

Philippine Air Force Component
 750th Combat Group, PAF
 1st Air Force Wing, PAF

Philippine Navy Component
 1st Marine Battalion Landing Team, PN
 Naval Forces Reserve - NCR
 202nd Naval Squadron, PN
 4th Naval Construction Battalion, PN
 4th Marine Brigade, PN

Philippine Army Component
 1st Mechanized Infantry Battalion, PA
 1st Armored Cavalry Troop, PA
 5th Civil-Military Operations Battalion, PA
 86th Infantry Battalion, PA
 80th Infantry Battalion, PA
 15th Infantry Division, PA

Lineage of Commanders
National Capital Region Defense Command (NCRDC)
 LTGEN Salvador M. Mison AFP – 02 Jan 1987 - 21 Sept 1987
 MGEN Ramon E. Montano AFP
 BGEN Raymundo T. Jarque AFP
 LTGEN Thelmo Y. Cunanan AFP
 MGEN Alexander P. Aguirre AFP
 GEN Rodolfo G. Biazon AFP – 23 Jan 1988 - 01 Aug 1991

National Capital Regional Command (NCRCOM)
 LTGEN Alberto F. Braganza AFP – 03 Nov 2003 - 04 Nov 2004
 LTGEN Alan D. Cabalquinto AFP – 04 Nov 2004 - 19 May 2006
 BGEN Salvador G. Peñaflor AFP – 19 May 2006 - 29 Jun 2006
 BGEN Juanito P. Gomez AFP – 29 Jun 2006 - 12 Sept 2006
 MGEN Ben D. Dolorfino AFP – 12 Sept 2006 - 07 Sept 2007
 MGEN Fernando L. Mesa AFP – 07 Sept 2006 - 02 Jun 2008
 MGEN Arsenio R. Arugay AFP – 07 Jun 2008 - 06 Feb 2009
 MGEN Jogy L. Fojas AFP – 06 Feb 2009 - 06 Nov 2009
 MGEN Reynaldu B. Mapagu AFP – 06 Nov 2009 - 13 Mar 2010
 RADM Feliciano A. Angue AFP – 13 Mar 2010 - 12 Aug 2010
 MGEN Arthur I. Tabaquero AFP – 12 Aug 2010 - 24 Nov 2010
 BGEN Romeo F. Fajardo AFP – 24 Nov 2010 - 23 Dec 2010
 MGEN Tristan M. Kison AFP – 23 Dec 2010 - 11 Jul 2012

Operations
 Anti-guerrilla operations against the New People's Army 
 Anti-terrorist operations against known terror groups operating in their AOR.
 Community Development of identified urban poor areas within the National Capital Region
 Intelligence and Counter-Intelligence Operations against government destabilizers.
 Disaster Relief, Rescue and Rehabilitation Operations.

Awards and decorations

Campaign streamers

Badges

See also
 AFP Joint Task Force-National Capital Region

References

External links
 Official Site of the AFP.
 Official Site of AFP JTF-NCR.

Regional commands of the Philippines
Military units and formations established in 2003